Ki Mua, released in 1999, is the second album by the Oceanic group, Te Vaka. This album contains the hit song "Pate Pate" which was very popular around the world and no.1 in the South Pacific.

Track listing
"Ki Mua"
"Lua Afe"
"Ke Ke Kitea"
"Pate Pate"
"Hea La Koe Iei"
"Pate Mo Tou Agaga"
"Vaka Atua"
"Tagaloa"
"Kaleve"
"Sagalogalo Ake"
"Aue Kapaku"
"Kau Tufuga Fai Vaka"

All songs on this album were written by Opetaia Foa'i with the exception of "Pate Pate" which was written by Opetaia Foa'i and Malcolm Smith, the beginning of Vaka atua and Aue kapaku which are traditional Tokelauan songs.

References

1999 albums
Te Vaka albums